"Only the Good Die Young" is a song from Billy Joel's 1977 rock album The Stranger. It was the third of four singles released from the album.

Song information
"Only the Good Die Young" was controversial for its time, with the lyrics written from the perspective of a young man determined to have sex with a Catholic girl. The song was inspired by a high school crush of Joel's, Virginia Callahan. The boy/narrator believes that the girl is refusing him because she comes from a religious Catholic family and that she believes premarital sex is sinful. He sings,

You Catholic girls start much too late,
but sooner or later it comes down to fate.
I might as well be the one.

Attempts to censor the song only made it more popular, after religious groups considered it anti-Catholic, and pressured radio stations to remove it from their playlists. "When I wrote 'Only the Good Die Young', the point of the song wasn't so much anti-Catholic as pro-lust," Joel told Performing Songwriter magazine. "The minute they banned it, the album started shooting up the charts."  In a 2008 interview, Joel also pointed out one part of the lyrics that virtually all the song's critics missed – the boy in the song failed to get anywhere with the girl, and she kept her chastity.

The song begins with a piano introduction and builds in intensity with Joel's high tempo vocals.

Billboard described "Only the Good Die Young" as one of Joel's "strongest and catchiest" songs.  Cash Box said that "Billy grabs the fun with a rollicking, handclapping beat, raspy sax solo and racy piano licks."

In 2023, Joel said of the song "It’s occurred to me recently that I’m trying to talk some poor innocent woman into losing her virginity because of my lust. It’s kind of a selfish song — like, who cares what happens to you? What about what I want?...But on the other hand, it was of its time. This was written in the mid-’70s, and I was trying to seduce girls. Why bulls— about it?"

Demo version
A demo, included in the box set My Lives, is a slower, reggae version of the song. Joel reprised the song's motif in this version with a church organ. Joel has stated publicly that he changed the reggae beat to a shuffle beat at the request of his long time drummer, Liberty DeVitto, who hated reggae music.

Track listing

7" single (1978)
 "Only the Good Die Young" – (3:55)
 "Get It Right the First Time" – (3:32)

Charts

Weekly charts

Year-end charts

Certifications

References

1978 singles
Billy Joel songs
Columbia Records singles
Song recordings produced by Phil Ramone
Songs written by Billy Joel
1978 songs
Obscenity controversies in music
Christianity in popular culture controversies
Censorship of music
Religious controversies in music